Coliseo Gran Chimú is an indoor sporting arena located in Trujillo, Peru. The capacity of the arena is 7,000 spectators  and has hosted some 2011 FIVB Women's Junior World Championship, 1982 FIVB Women's World Championship, and Peru women's national volleyball team matches.   It hosts indoor sporting events such as basketball, volleyball, and boxing.

See also
Estadio Mansiche
Trujillo
2013 Bolivarian Games

References

Indoor arenas in Peru
Buildings and structures in Trujillo, Peru
Sports in Trujillo, Peru